Kings Castle Provincial Park is a provincial park in the southeastern portion of Prince Edward Island, Canada.

References 

Provincial parks of Prince Edward Island
Parks in Kings County, Prince Edward Island